Ras GTPase-activating protein 4 is an enzyme that in humans is encoded by the RASA4 gene.

This gene encodes a member of the GAP1 family of GTPase-activating proteins that suppresses the Ras/mitogen-activated protein kinase pathway in response to Ca(2+). Stimuli that increase intracellular Ca(2+) levels result in the translocation of this protein to the plasma membrane, where it activates as GTPase activity. Consequently, Ras is converted from the active GTP-bound state to the inactive GDP-bound state and no longer activates downstream pathways that regulate gene expression, cell growth, and differentiation. Multiple transcript variants encoding different isoforms have been found for this gene.

References

Further reading

External links